Peter Denz (14 January 1940 – 25 June 2022) was a German engineer, inventor, entrepreneur and Oscar winner.

Biography 
Denz was born in Freiburg. In 1970, engineering graduate Denz, who had previously studied aircraft construction in Zürich and Munich, established the Präzisions-Entwicklung DENZ Fertigungs-GmbH, which specialized in the development, manufacturing and distribution of high-tech precision products for the industry as well the development, production and distribution of cinematographic film and video products, and of which he was the shareholder and Managing Director.

Denz received the Academy Award for technical merits (Technical Achievement Award) by the Academy of Motion Picture Arts and Sciences (AMPAS) in 1996 for the development of a flicker-free color video camera.

Honors (selection) 
 1984, iF product design award: Handlebar for remote control of zoom lenses for film cameras
 1985, iF product design award: Control knob for electronic control of camera lenses
 1986, iF product design award: Argus Viewfinder extension with Video Control System VCS
 1987, iF product design award: deniz.belt underwater energy belt
 1991, American Society of Lighting Designers Award: Video-Assist-System - digital, color
 1996, Academy Award for technical merits (Technical Achievement Award): Development of a flicker-free color video camera, VCSC digital video control system
 1996, Cinec Award in the category Camera Technology: VCSC digital 2000 Video-Control-System-Color
 1999, American Society of Cinematographers (ASC) Award
 2000, American Society of Cinematographers (ASC) Award

External links 
 Official website

References 

1940 births
2022 deaths
Academy Award for Technical Achievement winners
People from Freiburg im Breisgau